The Bennett-Carter CBS-1 Dottie S is an American high-wing, strut-braced single-seat glider that was designed by George Bennett and Richard Carter and first flown in 1958.

Design and development
The CBS-1 was commenced as a high school project by Bennett and Carter. They worked on it at Mississippi State College and completed construction in 1957 at Mississippi State University, with assistance from Guy Storer, who was head of the Raspet Flight Research Center at that time. The designation of "CBS-1" indicates "Carter-Bennett-Storer". The aircraft was first registered with the Federal Aviation Administration in 1958. Bennett went on to head the Aerophysics Department at MSU by the early 1980s.

The aircraft is constructed with a steel tube fuselage, wooden wings and tail surfaces, all covered in doped aircraft fabric. The wing is supported by a single strut. The wing design was based on the Schultz-Midwest MU-1 wings, but with a greater wingspan, employing a NACA 4415 airfoil. The tailplane was based on that of the Laister-Kaufmann LK-10A, while the fin and rudder shapes were scaled down from the  Schweizer SGS 2-12.  The CBS-1 has no spoilers or other glide path control device.

The landing gear was originally a take-off dolly and the aircraft landed on a fixed skid. This was later replaced with a fixed monowheel.

Operational history
In May 2011 the sole CBS-1 completed was still on the FAA registry and based in Hoboken, Georgia.

Specifications (CBS-1)

See also

References

1950s United States sailplanes
Homebuilt aircraft
Aircraft first flown in 1958